Opelika (pronounced  ) is a city in and the county seat of Lee County in the east-central part of the U.S. state of Alabama. It is a principal city of the Auburn-Opelika Metropolitan Area. As of the 2020 census, the population of Opelika is 30,995, an increase of 17.1 percent from the 2010 Census where the population was 26,477. The Auburn-Opelika, AL MSA with a population of 150,933, along with the Columbus, Georgia metropolitan area, comprises the Greater Columbus combined statistical area, a region home to 501,649 residents.

History
The Opelika area was first settled in 1832 after the Treaty of Cusseta was signed by the U.S. government and the Creek Nation. This treaty placed the land, and all other Creek territories east of the Mississippi River, under the possession of the United States government. Though the territory now belonged to the U.S., Opelika kept its Creek name, which translates to "large swamp".

Two decades after settlement, Opelika was chartered as a town on February 9, 1854, thanks to its rapid growth. This growth was due to the Montgomery & West Point Railroad Company's rail lines, which traversed the town and served as major means of transportation for unprocessed cotton between the northern and southern territories.

Opelika later received a new charter in 1870, and its rapid growth continued. The town nearly doubled in size between 1870 and 1900.

Opelika's downtown was packed with saloons catering to railroad workers and other men. Frequent gunfire in the street by intoxicated patrons resulted in railroads directing their passengers to duck beneath the windows when their trains passed through the town.

In 1882, two factions claimed to rule the city government, one known as the "Bar room" headed by Mayor Dunbar, a saloon keeper, and another known as the "Citizens". In a riot in late November–December of that year, a dozen men were wounded. In the end, a few were killed. The Citizens had claimed control of the city via the elections, but Dunbar refused to give up. After continued violence, the state legislature revoked the city's charter and the governor sent in the militia to restore order. The legislature appointed five commissioners to manage the city, a situation that continued until 1899. That year, the legislature restored the city's charter.

1900 to present
Opelika's largest employer is the East Alabama Medical Center, which paid around $119 million in salaries and benefits to more than 2,700 employees in 2009.

Geography

Climate

Demographics

2020 census

As of the 2020 United States census, there were 30,995 people, 11,866 households, and 7,199 families residing in the city.

2010 census
According to 2009 Census estimates, the median income for a household in the city was $35,243, and the median income for a family was $47,864.

The per capita income for the city is $18,023. Residents with income under poverty levels are 23.1% of the population, while 31.1% of children in the area are below the poverty line. Out of the total people living in poverty, 14.9% are 65 or older.

Economy

Opelika's economy has shifted away from a traditional basis in textile manufacturing. Since 2004, the city has experienced revitalization in many segments of the economy, including commercial, residential and industrial activity. Since January 2005, the City of Opelika has announced new industry investments and existing industry expansions totaling 1.5 billion and 4004 additional jobs.

On February 17, 2015, Golden State Foods Corp, a diversified supplier to the quick-service restaurant and retail industries, announced its decision to build a state-of-the-art meat processing facility  in the Northeast Opelika Industrial Park. Golden State Foods was established in 1947 and currently serves more than 125,000 restaurants from its 45 locations on five continents. With about 5,000 associates worldwide, Golden State Foods' core businesses include processing and distribution of liquid products, meat products, produce, dairy, and other services, providing a variety of networked solutions for the total supply chain spectrum.

In 2021 Hanwha Cimarron invested $130 million for a new manufacturing facility in Opelika, Alabama to supply large-scale tanks for hydrogen tube trailers for urban air mobility (UAM) and aerospace applications.  Niagara Bottling will open a new $112 million production facility in Opelika and hire 50 employees. The California-based company will locate a bottling plant in the Northeast Opelika Industrial Park along Interstate 85. Pharmavite, a manufacturer of vitamins, minerals, and other dietary supplements, has invested $151.9 million in capital and added 540 jobs to the Opelika workforce. Cumberland Plastic Solutions, a privately held custom injection molding company employing over 150 employees and supplying locale OEM's and automotive manufacturers Mercedes, Nissan, and GM with various plastic components has invested a total of $25.7 million in capital. Dinan Engineering, a company known for the high-performance aftermarket products it makes for cars, relocated to Opelika, Alabama joining APR in April 2018. Car Tech, LLC established operations in Opelika, Alabama with a capital investment of $72 million and created 200 new jobs. Additionally, Yongsan Automotive USA, Inc. established its first U.S. location in Opelika, Alabama with and investment of more than $5.5 million for manufacturing equipment and building improvements along with the creation of 150 new jobs over a three-year period. Also, West Fraser Inc., one of the largest lumber manufacturers in the United States, with 45 facilities in the southern U.S. and Western Canada, offers substantiable forestry, high-efficiency wood products.  With a total capital investment of $148.3 million, and an expansion announced in 2019 to construct a planner mill manufacturing capabilities will increase.

In early 2006, the Economic Development Association of Alabama named Opelika the top community in Alabama for business recruitment for the year 2005. Opelika also received the number one rank in the South as "Small Market of the Year" by Southern Business and Development magazine, a professional publication helping corporations around the country (and world) in their expansion, relocation, and development decisions. The city earned its #1 status through its success in bringing in such companies as Baxter International, an Illinois-based company that manufactures life-sustaining medical products including dialyzers has invested a total of $466 million in capital and added 360 jobs to the workforce in Opelika. Previously known as Gambro Renal Products, the Swedish-based manufacturer of dialyzers for kidney dialysis made the largest single initial investment in Lee County's history in 2005 with their capital $165.5 million investment, Jo-Ann Stores Distribution Center, Maxforma (currently Hanwha Advanced Materials America, which has provided a total capital investment of $122.3 million and has since created 518 jobs in Opelika), and Mando Corporation, one of the leading automotive parts manufacturers in the world, specializing in internationally competitive state-of-the-art chassis components and systems, with a total capital investment of $192.6 million and 522 jobs to the community in 2005.

Culture and recreation

In October 2021, the city opened the Opelika Public Library replacing the Lewis Cooper, Jr. Memorial Library as the only public library serving the city. The 27,000 square foot building includes study rooms, dedicated teen and children's spaces, as well as meeting spaces and several book collections. All services are free and open to the public during the library's hours: Monday-Thursday 8:30-7:00, Friday-Saturday 8:30-5:30, Closed Sundays.

In 2019 the city opened the Opelika Pickleball Facility, a state of the art pickleball facility with 12 individually fenced regulation courts for tournament style play. An additional 12 pickleball courts have been added to the facility for a total of 24 individually fenced regulation courts. The Opelika Pickleball Facility is free and open to the public.

In 2009 the City of Opelika built the Opelika SportsPlex and Aquatics Center, a $32 million facility.

In August 2005, the Auburn-Opelika Metropolitan Statistical Area was named by Golf Digest as the #1 area for golf in the United States. One part of the reason this area received this ranking is that Opelika is home to Robert Trent Jones Grand National. The site for the course, which hugs the edge of Lake Saugahatchee in Opelika's northwest, was described by Jones as the "single greatest" site for a golf complex that he had ever seen. The course, which is considered to be the jewel of Alabama's Robert Trent Jones Golf Trail, has hosted a number of national tournaments, including the 1997 Nike Tour championship, the 1998 LPGA Tournament of Champions, and the 2000 NCAA Men's Division 1 National Championship.  Robert Trent Jones Grand National also served as the tournament host for the first PGA Tour tournament in Alabama since 1990, the Barbasol Championship, held the same week as The Open Championship.

Government

Opelika is governed by a mayor-council government, with a mayor and a five-member city council.
The chief executive official of the city of Opelika is the mayor. The mayor is elected at-large for a four-year term. The mayor has complete executive power in the city, and can appoint and dismiss department heads at will. The current mayor of Opelika is Gary Fuller.

It is the Council's duty to approve annual operating and capital budgets, which are recommended by the Mayor, and to appoint members to various boards and agencies of city government. The city council is made up of five members, chosen for four-year terms each from one of five wards. Current council members through 2024 are:
•	Ward 1 – George Allen
•	Ward 2 – Erica Baker-Norris, President, Pro-Tem
•	Ward 3 – Tim Aja
•	Ward 4 – Eddie Smith, President
•	Ward 5 – Todd Rauch

Recently the city council designated Opelika as a City of Character. The City of Character program is made to recognize, emphasize and in some cases enforce good character throughout the community as well as mandate character training from CharacterFirst!. There are 49 character traits emphasized. These traits were designated by Bill Gothard.

Education
The Auburn-Opelika, AL MSA is home to Auburn University. Auburn University was founded in 1856 and is one of the largest universities in the South. Auburn University continues to grow, with 28,290 students enrolled for the 2017–2018 academic year, and is one of the area's largest employers with 4,830 full-time employees.

Opelika is home to a branch of Southern Union State Community College. Southern Union is a two-year community and technical college offering academic, industrial, and health sciences training. Southern Union is the only two-year college in Lee County, and is the largest two-year campus in the region. Southern Union employs 72 full-time and 137 part-time employees. Its enrollment stands at approximately 2,718 in the academic division and 1,600 in the technical division. Current technical programs include: Automotive Technology, Business Management and Supervision, Computer Science, Drafting and Design Technology, Heating and Air Conditioning Technology, Industrial Electricity/Electronics Technology, Industrial Maintenance Technology, Machine Shop Technology, Office Administration, Accounting, General Secretarial, Welding Technology, and Word Processing.

Opelika City Schools is the public school system of Opelika. The Opelika City School System consists of eight schools. There are three primary schools serving grades Kindergarten – 2, three intermediate schools serving grades 3–5, one middle school (grades 6–8), and one high school, Opelika High School (grades 9–12). An alternative learning center houses a variety of programs including a 6–12 alternative program, a Mental Health Association day treatment classroom, the Choices Program for teen moms, and a Dental Clinic.

Media

Opelika is in the greater Montgomery media market, served by Montgomery television affiliates of the ABC, CBS, NBC, Fox and PBS networks. The Opelika-Auburn News is the long-standing newspaper serving the city.

Transportation
U.S. Route 29, U.S. Route 280 and U.S. Route 431 converge in Opelika. Alabama State Route 14 and Alabama State Route 51 converge in the city as well.

Interstate 85 passes along the eastern and southern edges of Opelika.

Adjacent Auburn has the Auburn University Regional Airport, a general aviation airport. The nearest airport with commercial flights is Columbus Metropolitan Airport in Columbus, Georgia.

The last passenger train service was the Illinois Central Railroad's City of Miami (Chicago - Miami), having its final run in 1971. The Illinois Central's Seminole (Chicago - Jacksonville) served Opelika until 1969. Amtrak service is proposed under the American Jobs Plan.

Gallery

Notes

References
 Alabama State Department of Education. Accountability Reporting. Retrieved June 13, 2004.
 Alabama State Department of Education. Reports. Retrieved October 5, 2006.
 Auburn, Alabama, City of. (2000) The City of Auburn, Alabama Comprehensive Financial Report for the Fiscal Year Ended September 30, 2000. Finance Department.
 Auburn, Alabama, City of. (2000) The City of Auburn Proposed Biennial Budget for FY 05 & FY 06 Budget Message. Office of the City Manager.
 Center for Demographic Research, Auburn University – Montgomery. U.S. Census Reports for Opelika City for the years 1950, 1960, 1970, and 1980.
 Conway Data. (May 2004). Top Groups of 2003. Retrieved on October 14, 2006, from Press Release: Site Selections 2003 Top Deals and Top Groups. Also available in Site Selection magazine (May 2004).
 Department of Industrial Relations, State of Alabama. (1978–2005). Total Nonagricultural Employment for Lee County. Montgomery, Alabama: Author.
 Duran, Rachel (2003). "Automotive Industry in the Driver's Seat", Global Corporate Xpansion, July 1, 2003. Birmingham Ala., Latitude 3 Media Group.
 EDAA Newsletter (Fall 2006). EDAA/SEDC Community Awards Presented at Conference. Economic Development Council of Alabama. Retrieved on October 14, 2006, from Economic Development Association of Alabama.
 Golf Digest, August 2005 Vol.56, No. 8
 Goodwyn, Mills and Cawood, Inc. (1999). Strategic Plan for the City of Opelika.
 Nunn, Alexander (Ed.) (1983). Lee County and Her Forebears. Montgomery, Ala., Herff Jones. LCCCN 83-081693
 Opelika, Alabama, City of. (2005). Comprehensive Plan for the City of Opelika. Opelika, Alabama. Opelika Planning Department.
 Opelika, Alabama, City of. (2005). Financial Statements for the Fiscal Year ended September 30, 2005 . Retrieved October 9, 2006.
 Opelika, Alabama, City of. (2005). Our City Council Members . Retrieved August 9, 2005.
 Public Affairs Research Council of Alabama. (Summer 2005). Alabama Reading Test Results Show Overall Improvements from 2004 to 2005, but School System Results Vary. The PARCA Quarterly, 3–7.
 Randle, Mike. (Spring 2006). Top Deals & Hot Markets 2006: Alabama and North Carolina: Performing Economic Miracles. Southern Business and Development Magazine. Retrieved on October 14, 2006, from Southern Business and Development.
 Site Selection online. (May 2006). Top Groups 2005. Retrieved on October 14, 2006, from TOP GROUPS 2005-- Site Selection magazine, May 2006. Also available in Site Selection magazine (May 2006).
 Jake Hess, New York Times Obituaries, Jan 11, 2004.

External links

 City of Opelika official website
 Opelika Chamber of Commerce

Cities in Alabama
Cities in Lee County, Alabama
County seats in Alabama
Columbus metropolitan area, Georgia
Auburn metropolitan area, Alabama
Alabama placenames of Native American origin